Adasi was according to the Assyrian King List a usurper-king in Assyria during, or shortly after, the reign of the king Ashur-dugul and through his son Bel-bani the progenitor of the later Adaside dynasty. Because the name of Adasi and the other seven usurpers said to have vied for power against Ashur-dugul and each other do not appear in other sources and are suspiciously similar to the names of the eponyms under Ashur-dugul's reign, modern scholars question whether Adasi and the others were kings or usurpers at all, and not simply generals and officials misattributed as kings by the scribes of the list.

References

18th-century BC Assyrian kings